Simply Baatein With Raveena  is an interactive talk/chat show produced by Urban Brew Studios and hosted by Raveena Tandon. The show started airing on 7 September 2014 on Sony Pal. Raveena interacts with celebrities to discuss topics relating to womanhood.

Episodes

References 

Hindi-language television shows
2014 Indian television series debuts
Indian television talk shows
2014 Indian television series endings
Sony Pal original programming